Paradela is a Hispanic surname. Notable people with the surname include:

José Paradela (born 1998), Argentine football player
Luis Paradela (born 1997), Cuban football player

Spanish-language surnames